Horst Aisslinger (2 April 1925 – 25 February 1992) was a German philatelist who was added to the Roll of Distinguished Philatelists in 1981.

References

Signatories to the Roll of Distinguished Philatelists
1925 births
1992 deaths
German philatelists